Aglaia elaeagnoidea, the droopy leaf or priyangu, is a species of plant in the family Meliaceae. It is a 10m tall tree found in American Samoa, Australia (Western Australia and Queensland), Cambodia, China, India, Indonesia, Malaysia, New Caledonia, Papua New Guinea, the Philippines, Samoa, Sri Lanka, Taiwan (Hengchun Peninsula)), Thailand, Vanuatu, and Vietnam.

Description
Timber is bright red color is a hard wood. Bark is greyish brown in color. White latex can be exudate. Leaves are compound, imparipinnate, alternate; lamina narrow-elliptic to oblanceolate; apex bluntly acute to subacuminate; base acute to cuneate. Flowers show axillary panicles inflorescence. Fruit is a brown or red, indehiscent globose berry.

Common names
English — droopy leaf, priyangu, coastal boodyarra
Hindi — 
Tamil — ,  
Mandarin — ,  (red wood)
Sinhala —

Uses
The wood is hard and is a good material for construction. The aborigines often used it to build houses in Taiwan. It can also be used to make various utensils.)

References

elaeagnoidea
Sapindales of Australia
Rosids of Western Australia
Trees of the Pacific
Flora of tropical Asia
Trees of Taiwan
Flora of Queensland
Least concern flora of Australia
Least concern biota of Queensland
Taxonomy articles created by Polbot